The Great Bullion Famine was a shortage of precious metals that struck Europe in the 15th century, with the worst years of the famine lasting from 1457 to 1464. During the Middle Ages, gold and silver coins saw widespread use as currency in Europe, and facilitated trade with the Middle East and Asia; the shortage of these metals therefore became a problem for European economies. The main cause for the bullion famine was outflow of silver to the East unequaled by European mining output, although 15th century contemporaries believed the bullion famine to be caused by hoarding.

The discovery of the Americas with its silver and gold, along with innovations in mining techniques, and the Portuguese gaining access to African gold ended the bullion famine.

Background
The main cause for the bullion famine was outflow of silver to the East unequaled by European mining output. The historian John Day supports this theory stating the loss of gold and silver was due to large-scale trading with the Levant, which consisted of: spices, silks, rare dyestuffs, pearls, and precious gems. The primary markets for these goods were found in Egypt, Syria and Cyprus.

Fifteenth century contemporaries believed the bullion famine to be caused by hoarding. Whereas, Şevket Pamuk, professor of Economics and Economic History, states the bullion famine was exacerbated by the increase in the hoarding of coin. In contrast, the historian Diana Wood states that the silver shortage exacerbated the economies already damaged by war, famine, and plague.

During first half of the 14th century European mining more than compensated the bullion loss from trade with the Middle East. Prior to the Black Death, the loss of silver in England was caused by "accident and export". Yet by 1348, the Black Death had slowed silver mining. The mint at Bordeaux suffered a drop in production by fifty percent during the 1380s, and by 1392 French mints were suffering an acclerated decline in silver coining. In contrast, from 1346-1384, Flemish mints continued to produce silver groats, yet by 1392 the mint at Ghent had stopped coining and the Bruges mint fell idle in 1402.

France
By 1405 French gold crowns were hardly issued at all, and in 1409 Parisian money-changers declared they could not sell bullion to the mint at any price. Even the ducal mints of John the Fearless stopped minting coins by 1432-1434. From 1400-1420, gold coins were no longer circulated in Toulouse. In 1414-1415, the Bordelais' Three Estates, faced with reports of a failure of circulating silver, appealed for action to be taken.

England
The English mint in Durham suffered a decline in output until its closure from 1394 to 1412. By 1411, the English sterling had been devalued to prevent silver loss in trade with Flanders. The London mint's bullion famine was partially mitigated by the reminting of old heavy coins to the new lighter standards which took effect in 1412. While the lightening of the gold English noble occurred from 1421-1524.

Italy
During the 1370s, the mines in Serbia and Bosnia allowed Venice to avoid the worst of the silver shortage, but the bullion loss drained silver mines in Bohemia and Sardinia as quickly as it was mined.

By 1420, gold was sent to the Fondaco dei Tedeschi in Venice, thence to the mint and then used in trade with the Mamluk Sultanate. The expansion of the Ottoman Empire into the Balkans had worsened the supply of bullion from mines to the rest of Europe, and this expansion exposed Venice to the silver famine until the discovery of new silver mines in northern Europe in the 1450s and 1460s. By 1495, Venice merchants were using copper coinage to conduct trade for spices with the Mamluk Sultanate. Prior to Vasco de Gama's voyage in 1497, Venetian trade exported 300,000 ducats in bullion to Alexandria every year.

Spain
Spain suffered an economic crisis due to the bullion famine, and yet the famine, and with it the search for gold, drove the exploration and conquest of the New World.

Egypt
By 1397-1398, the silver famine had spread to the Mamluk Sultanate which terminated the minting of silver dirhams. Consequently, importing slaves from the Black Sea region was an immense drain on Mamluk coin supply.

Ottoman Empire
In the Ottoman Empire, despite the capture of Serbian and Bosnian silver mines, Mehmed II imposed strict laws to limit silver circulation. Any bullion produced or imported to the Ottoman Empire was to be submitted to the mint and coined. Included in this law was the employment of yasakci kuls(silver seekers) who were authorized to search any and all persons and places and confiscate silver. Despite these measures the Ottoman Empire also suffered from the silver famine.

Famine
The bullion famine caused a European economic recession that only the Portuguese and Low Countries were capable of surviving. During the 15th century, silver bullion became so rare that commodities were used in place of coin. European trade, c.1410, was crippled by the bullion famine and barely improved by the time the second bullion famine struck in c.1440.

Barter became so common place that the spice pepper was used in place of bullion, with the Germans calling their bankers, peppermen. In England, the lack of bullion brought about a barter system, while in France people resorted to barter by 1420. Edward IV passed an act in 1464, stating that carders, spinners, weavers, and fullers were to be paid lawful money for their wages. Although continued complaints by the cloth industry indicate this act was neglected. In France, the barter system was improvised based on the value of commodities, if one commodity were deemed more expensive than the other, the difference was topped off with a payment of money.

As the bullion supply worsened, mining and refining techniques were improved. Georgius Agricola in his work, De re metallica, recorded these techniques. It also drove shipwrights to enhance the ability of merchant ships to extend their trading range. These naval advances were copied by the Genoans for their merchant vessels.

The exploration and later discovery of America, is believed to have been fueled by the bullion famine. Columbus's voyage was motivated by the search for gold, being mentioned in his diary sixty-five times. The Portuguese exploration of Africa and a trade route to India via the Cape of Good Hope, was similarly fueled by the famine.

Restoration

The discovery of the New World and with it silver from Mexico and Peru ended the bullion famine by 1550. Pieper supports this stating the Caribbean gold mines were exploited to end the European bullion famine. Moyk Lieberman states that an increase in bullion, the reopening of old mines, and a resurgence in population allowed mine production to remain constant, which also assisted in ending the bullion famine. By 1440s, Portugal was able to bolster its economy by trading for African gold bullion.

See also
Great Slump
Mining and metallurgy in medieval Europe
Age of Discovery
Spanish Price Revolution

References

Sources

15th century in Europe
15th-century economic history
Economic history of Europe
Financial crises
Metallism